Colorado Rush may refer to:

 Flatirons Rush SC, a semi-professional soccer team formerly known as the Colorado Rush SC that competes in USL League Two
 Real Colorado Cougars, a women's soccer team formerly known as the Colorado Rush that competes in the USL W-League
 Juncus confusus, a species of rush known by the common name Colorado rush

See also
 Colorado Gold Rush